Manoel Wenceslau Leite de Barros (December 19, 1916 – November 13, 2014) was a Brazilian poet. He won many awards for his work, including twice the Prêmio Jabuti (the "Tortoise Prize"), the most important literary award in Brazil.

Barros was born in Cuiabá, and is regarded by critics as one of the great names of contemporary Brazilian poetry, and by many authors he has been considered the greatest living poet from Brazil. The poet Carlos Drummond de Andrade recognized Manoel de Barros as the Brazil's greatest poet.

In 1998 the poet was rewarded with the "National prize of Literature of the Ministry of the Culture from Brazil", for the set of the work.  He died at age 97, in Campo Grande.

Bibliography
Portuguese
 1937—Poemas concebidos sem pecado
 1942—Face imóvel
 1956—Poesias
 1960—Compêndio para uso dos pássaros
 1966—Gramática expositiva do chão
 1974—Matéria de poesia
 1982—Arranjos para assobio
 1985—Livro de pré-coisas
 1989—O guardador das águas - Prêmio Jabuti de Literatura (Tortoise Prize) 1990.
 1990—Poesia quase toda
 1991—Concerto a céu aberto para solos de aves
 1993—O livro das ignorãças - Prize Alfonso Guimarães of the National Library from Brazil.
 1996—Livro sobre nada - Prize Nestlé of Brazilian Literature 1997, Category: Poetry.
 1998—Retrato do artista quando coisa
 1999—Exercícios de ser criança
 2000—Ensaios fotográficos
 2001—O fazedor de amanhecer [Children's literature] - Prêmio Jabuti (Tortoise Prize) de Literatura 2002.
 2001—Poeminhas pescados numa fala de João
 2001—Tratado geral das grandezas do ínfimo
 2003—Memórias inventadas (A infância)
 2003—Cantigas para um passarinho à toa
 2004—Poemas rupestres - Prize Nestlé of Brazilian Literature 2006.
 2005—Memórias inventadas II (A segunda infância)
 2007—Memórias inventadas III (A terceira infância)

Translated editions
German
 1996—Das Buch der Unwissenheiten

French
 2003—La Parole sans Limites. Une Didactique de lInvention

Spanish
 2002 - Todo lo que no invento es falso
 2005 - Riba del dessemblat

English
 2010 - Birds for a Demolition (translated by Idra Novey, Carnegie Mellon University Press)

Notes

External links
 Poem by Manoel de Barros in Spanish Language. Adrian'dos Delima. rim&via. Brasil. 2011.
 releituras.com
 Eduquenet. Textos, Artigos e Análises. O Livro das Ignorãças - Manoel de Barros.

1916 births
People from Cuiabá
Brazilian male poets
Portuguese-language writers
2014 deaths
20th-century Brazilian poets
20th-century Brazilian male writers